The Air Force and Air Defence Brigade of Bosnia and Herzegovina is part of the Armed Forces of Bosnia and Herzegovina. The headquarters is in Sarajevo. It maintains operating bases at Sarajevo International Airport, Banja Luka International Airport and Tuzla International Airport.

History
The Air Force and Anti-Aircraft Defence Brigade of Bosnia and Herzegovina was formed when elements of the Army of the Federation of Bosnia and Herzegovina and the Republika Srpska Air Force were merged in 2006.

Structure 

Air Force and Air Defense Brigade, at Sarajevo Air Base and Banja Luka Air Base
 1st Helicopter Squadron, at Banja Luka Air Base
 2nd Helicopter Squadron, at Sarajevo Air Base
 Air Defence Battalion, at Sarajevo Air Base
 Early Warning and Surveillance Battalion, at Banja Luka Air Base
 Flight Support Battalion, with detachments at the two air bases

Airbases

Banja Luka International Airport
Sarajevo International Airport
Tuzla International Airport

Aircraft

Retired
Previous notable aircraft operated by the Air Force consisted of the UTVA 75, CASA C-212 Aviocar, Mil Mi-34, Mil Mi-24, Soko J-22 Orao, Soko G-2 Galeb, Soko G-4 Super Galeb, and the Bell 206 helicopter.

Air Defense

See also 
Armed Forces of Bosnia and Herzegovina

References

External links
Bosnia and Herzegovina Ministry of Defence

 
Bosnia
Aviation in Bosnia and Herzegovina
Military units and formations established in 2006
2006 establishments in Bosnia and Herzegovina